Molopanthera is a genus of flowering plants belonging to the family Rubiaceae.

Its native range is Eastern Brazil.

Species
Species:
 Molopanthera paniculata Turcz.

References

Rubiaceae
Rubiaceae genera